Stages is a compilation album by Eric Clapton, which was released in May 1993. It contains a collection of tracks from various stages of Clapton's long career up to that point in time.

Track listing
"Steppin' Out"
"Ramblin' On My Mind"
"Hideaway"
"Have You Heard"
"Out Side Woman Blues"
"Crossroads" (Live)
"They Call It Stormy Monday (Live)"
"Well Alright"
"Bell Bottom Blues"
"Blues Power" (Live)
"Drifting Blues" (Live)
"Mean Old Frisco"

Credits
Ginger Baker – Drums
Blind Faith – Performer
Jack Bruce – Musician
Eric Clapton – Arranger, Guitar, Musician, Vocals
Derek & the Dominos – Performer
Hughie Flint – Musician
Jim Gordon – Musician
Ric Grech – Musician
John Mayall – Arranger, Musician, Guitar
John Mayall & the Bluesbreakers – Performer
Carl Radle – Musician
Bobby Whitlock – Musician
Steve Winwood – Guitar

References

Eric Clapton compilation albums
1993 compilation albums